Joseph Rush Wimberly, I (December 30, 1873 – March 11, 1943), was at the turn of the 20th century successively a member of both houses of the Louisiana State Legislature from Arcadia, the seat of Bienville Parish in North Louisiana. He served two terms in the Louisiana House of Representatives from 1900 to 1908. and a single term in the Louisiana State Senate from 1908 to 1912, representing Bienville and neighboring Claiborne parishes. Wimberly served on the Education committees of both houses during his 12-year tenure.
 
Wimberly was the youngest of eleven children of the former Francis Nix and John L. Wimberly, a planter and a native of Georgia who migrated westward to Louisiana in 1840. Rush Wimberly graduated from Arcadia High School, an entity of  the Bienville Parish School Board. Having privately thereafter studied the law, he was admitted to the bar in 1894.  After his legislative years, Wimberly moved to Shreveport in Caddo Parish in northwestern Louisiana, where he formed the law firm, Wimberly, Reeves and Dorman. He returned to Arcadia and for ten years was the parish attorney for Bienville Parish and for a number of years the parish public school superintendent.

Wimberly was an alternate delegate to the 1936 Democratic National Convention, which met in Philadelphia to renominate the Roosevelt-Garner ticket.

In 1897, Wimberly married the former Annie May Poland (1877-1960), and the couple had three children. The oldest, Lorris M. Wimberly, served in the state House, including several stints as Speaker. Lorris Wimberly was a political ally of his fellow Democrat, Governor Earl Kemp Long. The other Wimberly children were  J. Rush Wimberly, Jr. (1906-1982), an attorney, and Edrie W. Albrecht (1902-1983), the wife of Henry Gustave Albrecht (1899-1945) of Arcadia.

Wimberly and most of his family are interred at the Arcadia Cemetery.

References

|

1873 births
1943 deaths
Democratic Party members of the Louisiana House of Representatives
Democratic Party Louisiana state senators
Louisiana lawyers
People from Arcadia, Louisiana
Politicians from Shreveport, Louisiana
Louisiana state court judges
Methodists from Louisiana
Protestants from Louisiana